The Good Templars Hall is a Greek Revival style public building that was built in 1858 in Nininger in the U.S. state of Minnesota. The Nininger Chapter of the Independent Order of Good Templars, a temperance group, built the two-story hall to have a place for socializing without alcohol. When the railroad bypassed Nininger in 1859,  the town began to fail, and the building was sold to the school district. In the late 1870s the first floor was removed due to decay, and the upper floor and roof were lowered to the ground level. The building was renovated by an historical group and used as a community center until it was moved to the Little Log House Pioneer Village in 2005. A plaque has been erected near its original location.

References

Buildings and structures in Dakota County, Minnesota
Clubhouses on the National Register of Historic Places in Minnesota
Cultural infrastructure completed in 1858
Relocated buildings and structures in Minnesota
National Register of Historic Places in Dakota County, Minnesota